Muzyka Dla Imigrantów is an EP by Bogdan Raczynski. It was released on Rephlex Records in 2001. The CD was limited edition and only available originally through www.bogdanraczynski.com. Three of the tracks are also available on his 2001 album, My Love I Love. The title means "Music for Immigrants" in Polish, and most of the text on the album cover is in Polish. NME named it their "Single of the Week".

Track listing
Translations of the titles are listed after, in parentheses.

Credits
 Głos, Akordeon, Trąbka, Harfa, Fujarka - Bogdan W. Raczynski (voice, accordion, trumpet, harp, pipe - Bogdan W. Raczynski)
 Napisy: Mama I Tata (inscriptions by mom and dad)
 Dla Mamy I Taty (dedicated for mom and dad)

References

External links
 

1999 EPs
Bogdan Raczynski albums
Rephlex Records EPs